The term foreign object or foreign objects may refer to:

An object that intrudes where it should not be, as into a living body or machinery: see foreign body
An object introduced into a wrestling match, often to give the bearer an unfair advantage: see Foreign object (professional wrestling)
 Foreign Objects (TV series), a Canadian TV series from 2001
 Foreign Objects (band), a band from West Chester, Pennsylvania 
 Foreign Objects (musical composition), a 5:25 avant-garde music piece for piano and percussion by composer Terry Riley.